The Kambaniru River (Indonesian: Sungai Kambaniru; Sumba name: Luku Kambaniru) is a river in the island of Sumba, Indonesia, about 1,500 km east of the capital Jakarta. With a length of approximately 118 km, it flows periodically through 9 districts in the East Sumba Regency, exiting to the Bay of Kambaniru (Indonesian: Teluk Kambaniru) near the city of Waingapu to the Sawu Sea, with high debit in the wet season, but very low in the dry season.

Hydrology 
The drainage basin of Kambaniru covers an area of 111,000 hectare, comprising 34 villages and 8 administrative sub-districts. The area suffers from heavy degradation, requiring massive rehabilitation.
Although quite low in water during the dry season, the river floods the banks yearly during the wet season, due to the minimal flood control programs. The lack of bridges forces elementary school students of Bidipraing to cross the river width of 65 meter and the depth of 1.2 meter daily to go to school in the village of Kiritanah, Kambera.

Kambaniru Dam was finished on 8 September 1992, located 10 km from the city of Waingapu, is the biggest dam in the regency, providing water to 1,440 hectares of rice fields in Mauliru, Kawangu and Kambaniru. The dam is located in the village of Malumbi, Kambera.

Geography 
The river flows along the northern area of Sumba with predominantly tropical savanna climate (designated as As in the Köppen-Geiger climate classification). The annual average temperature in the area is 27 °C. The warmest month is October, when the average temperature is around 31 °C, and the coldest is June, at 24 °C. The average annual rainfall is 1203 mm. The wettest month is December, with an average of 257 mm rainfall, and the driest is August, with 2 mm rainfall.

Song 
In 1963 Ms. Mathilda Taka (Mrs. Daniswan Anwar) composed a song about this river titled "Kambaniru" which was famous in the 1960s.

See also
List of rivers of Indonesia
List of rivers of Lesser Sunda Islands

References

External links 
  Name and Length of Rivers in the Province of East Nusa Tenggara

Rivers of Sumba
Rivers of Indonesia